Daniel Archibong (born September 12, 1997) is a former American football defensive end. He played college football at Temple.

College career
Archibong  was a member of the Temple Owls for five seasons. He played two games as a true freshman before deciding to redshirt the rest of the season. Archibong finished his collegiate career with 89 tackles, 10.5 tackles for loss, 6.0 sacks and eight passes broken up in 48 games played.

Professional career

Chicago Bears
Archibong was signed by the Chicago Bears as an undrafted free agent on May 1, 2021. He was waived on August 31, 2021, at the end of training camp.

Pittsburgh Steelers
Archibong was signed to the Pittsburgh Steelers' practice squad on September 1, 2021. He was elevated to the active roster on November 21, 2021, for the team's Week 11 game against the Los Angeles Chargers and made his NFL debut in the game. He was elevated once again to the active roster from the practice squad on November 27, 2021. He signed a reserve/future contract with the Steelers on January 18, 2022. On July 11, 2022, the Steelers placed Archibong on the reserve/retired list.

References

External links
 Temple Owls bio
 Pittsburgh Steelers bio

1997 births
Living people
American football defensive tackles
Chicago Bears players
Pittsburgh Steelers players
Players of American football from Pennsylvania
Temple Owls football players
Sportspeople from Delaware County, Pennsylvania